Southend-on-Sea was a local government district from 1866 to 1974 around the seaside resort of Southend-on-Sea in Essex, England. Its origin was a local board formed for the parish of St John the Baptist, which had been split off from Prittlewell for ecclesiastical purposes in 1842. It was incorporated as a municipal borough in 1892. In 1889, when Essex County Council was formed, Southend-on-Sea was within the administrative county of Essex. However, through expansion in area and population by 1914 it was split off from the administrative county as a county borough. The local authority was Southend Local Board from 1886 and Southend Corporation from 1892. The corporation changed the name of the town from Southend to Southend-on-Sea in 1893. In 1974 the county borough was reconstituted as a non-metropolitan district with the same boundaries and some powers were transferred to Essex County Council.

Governance
Southend adopted the Local Government Act 1858 and a local board was established in 1866. In 1875 it became an urban sanitary district. The local board gained powers in 1875 to purchase Southend Pier and the legal right to change the name of the local board and therefore the town. It was incorporated as a municipal borough in 1892. The name was changed from Southend to Southend-on-Sea in 1893. It gained the status of county borough in 1914, which ended the jurisdiction of Essex County Council in Southend. Southend-on-Sea Borough Constabulary was created on 1 April 1914, split off from Essex Constabulary.

Expansion
The local government district originally consisted of the South End of the parish of Prittlewell. This became a separate parish of St John the Baptist for ecclesiastical purposes in 1842. In 1877 the local government district was expanded to include all of the parish of Prittlewell, including the settlements of Westcliff and Chalkwell.

The parish of Southchurch was absorbed by the borough of Southend-on-Sea on 1 November 1897.

In 1913 the borough was expanded by gaining the former area of Leigh-on-Sea Urban District, consisting of the parish of Leigh (1527 acres) and part of the parish of Eastwood (383 acres) from Rochford Rural District. The civil parishes within the borough were combined to form a single parish of Southend-on Sea.

In 1933 the borough was expanded by gaining territory of Rochford Rural District consisting of parts of the parishes of Eastwood (1342 acres), Great Wakering (156 acres), North Shoebury (499 acres) and Shopland (201 acres). At the same time, the former area of Shoeburyness Urban District, consisting of the parish of South Shoebury (1031 acres) was gained.

Transport
Using the powers secured in 1875, the local board took over Southend Pier. The borough had tram, trolleybus and bus undertakings that were operated by Southend Corporation Transport.

Replacement
On 1 April 1969 the separate borough police force was reincorporated into the Essex police as the Essex and Southend-on-Sea Joint Constabulary. The reform of local government outside Greater London which culminated in the Local Government Act 1972 eliminated county boroughs. In their place a two-tier system of counties and districts was created. The proposed reform for Essex was for Southend on Sea to become a non-metropolitan district with many powers returning to Essex County Council. A new Thamesside metropolitan county was proposed covering north Kent and south Essex, which would have changed the status of Southend on Sea to a metropolitan district and retained many powers locally, but was unsuccessful. The County Borough of Southend on Sea was replaced by the Southend-on-Sea District on 1 April 1974. The council and corporation were replaced by Southend-on-Sea District Council and Essex County Council, which were established as shadow authorities in 1973. The new district had the same boundaries as the county borough.

Coat of arms

References

County boroughs of England
County Borough